The Woutertje Pieterse Prijs (Dutch for Woutertje Pieterse Prize) is an annual Dutch literary award for the best children's book of the preceding year.

History 

The award was first given in 1988.  The award is awarded annually in March or April.

The award is named after the character Woutertje Pieterse in Ideeën written by Multatuli. The award's name refers to the character's curiosity and tendency to go against society's morals. Similarly, the Woutertje Pieterse Prijs is awarded to books that differ from children's literature with a didactic or moralistic nature.

Some authors have received the award multiple times, including Toon Tellegen (1992, 1994), Joke van Leeuwen (1997, 1999), and Paul Biegel (1991, 2000). In 2018, Annet Schaap with her book Lampje was the first author to receive this award with a debut novel. 

The prize money has been provided by various organisations over the years, including the Lirafonds and Bruna. The award was sponsored by Lirafonds until 2014 and by Bruna in 2015, 2016 and 2017. The 2018 edition of the award was sponsored using one-off funding. The 2019 and 2020 editions of the award are sponsored by the Brook Foundation and Stichting De Versterking.

Winners 

 1988 - Imme Dros, Annetje Lie in het holst van de nacht
 1989 - Margriet Heymans, Lieveling, boterbloem
 1990 - Anne Vegter and Geerten Ten Bosch, De dame en de neushoorn
 1991 - Paul Biegel, Anderland: een Brandaan mythe
 1992 - Toon Tellegen, Juffrouw Kachel
 1993 - Jaap Lamberton (awarded posthumously), Een heel lief konijn, written by Imme Dros
 1994 - Toon Tellegen, Bijna iedereen kon omvallen
 1995 - Anne Provoost, Vallen
 1996 - Anton Quintana, Het boek van Bod Pa
 1997 - Joke van Leeuwen, Iep!
 1998 - Wim Hofman, Zwart als inkt
 1999 - Joke van Leeuwen and Malika Blain, Bezoekjaren
 2000 - Paul Biegel, Laatste verhalen van de eeuw
 2001 - Bart Moeyaert, Broere
 2002 - Peter van Gestel, Winterijs
 2003 - Guus Kuijer, Ik ben Polleke hoor!
 2004 - Edward van de Vendel and Fleur van der Weel, Superguppie
 2005 - Thé Tjong-Khing, Waar is de taart?
 2006 - Harrie Geelen and Imme Dros, Bijna jarig
 2007 - Harm de Jonge, Josja Pruis
 2008 - Hans Hagen, Verkocht
 2009 - Peter Verhelst and Carll Cneut, Het geheim van de keel van de nachtegaal
 2010 - Carli Biessels, Juwelen van stras
 2011 - Benny Lindelauf, De hemel van Heivisj
 2012 - Ted van Lieshout, Driedelig paard
 2013 - Kristien Dieltiens, Kelderkind
 2014 - Marjolijn Hof, De regels van drie
 2015 - Bette Westera and Sylvia Weve, Doodgewoon
 2016 - Edward van de Vendel and Martijn van der Linden, Stem op de okapi
 2017 - Gerda Dendooven, Stella, ster van de zee
 2018 - Annet Schaap, Lampje
 2019 - Kathleen Vereecken and Charlotte Peys, Alles komt goed, altijd
 2020 - Bette Westera and Sylvia Weve, Uit elkaar
 2021 - Benny Lindelauf and Ludwig Volbeda, Hele verhalen voor een halve soldaat
 2022 - Raoul Deleo and Noah J. Stern, Terra Ultima

References

External links 
 Official website (Dutch)

Dutch literary awards
Children's literary awards
Dutch children's literature
Awards established in 1988
1988 establishments in the Netherlands